Duraid Munajim is a Toronto-based film director and a freelance cinematographer.

Career 
Munajim is an Iraqi-Persian born in Kuwait in 1972, to an Iraqi Arab father and Iranian Persian mother. Duraid was 17 years of age when his family immigrated to Canada. He began studying anthropology at Vanier College, Montreal but had later received his BFA in film production in 1997 from Concordia University, in Montreal in which he made his thesis film, Tempus Fugit.

His work has been screened in festivals around the world, including IDFA in Amsterdam, Dokfest in Munich, as well as festivals in Switzerland, Lebanon, France, and across the U.S. and Canada.

A short documentary that titled "what I've lost" was screened at the Toronto International Film Festival, Montreal Nouveau film fest, Gulf Film Festival and others. Another of his works, exile & empire: 20 shorts on Iraq, is an experimental 'essay-driven' documentary on Iraq, past and up to the U.S. invasion of 2003, told through a series of short films.

In 2007 Duraid worked as one of the principal camera operators on The Hurt Locker, which ended up winning multiple awards internationally, including Best Picture at the 2010 Oscar awards. In 2011 he served as Director of Photography on Buzkashi Boys, which was nominated for best live action short at the 2013 Oscars. In 2012 Duraid worked again with Kathryn Bigelow on Zero Dark Thirty as a principal camera operator.

Selected filmography 
 Entre-temps à Beyrouth - 2002
 Fire Watch - 2003
 19. - 2003
 Solo - 2003
 Acrobats and Maniacs - 2004 (TV)
 All the Ships at Sea - 2004
 Rings - 2004
 Next: A Primer on Urban Painting - 2005
 Lower East Side Stories - 2005
 Les jeux d'enfants - 2008
 What I've Lost - 2008
 The Hurt Locker - 2009 (camera operator)
 Son of Babylon - 2010
 Zero Dark Thirty - 2012
 The Switch (La Switch) - 2022

References

External links 
Official Site

Living people
1972 births
Concordia University alumni
Iraqi film directors
Iranian film directors
Iraqi cinematographers
Iranian cinematographers
Iraqi emigrants to Canada
Iranian emigrants to Canada
Iranian people of Iraqi descent
Canadian cinematographers